"Jerk It Out" is a song by Swedish rock band Caesars. It was released in 2002 (when the band was known as Caesars Palace) as the lead single from their album Love for the Streets; it is also featured on the follow-up Paper Tigers in remixed form. The song was an international success following a re-release in 2005, reaching number eight on the UK Singles Chart and peaking at number 70 on the US Billboard Hot 100.

Chart performance
The song was first released for radio airplay in Sweden in early 2002 and reached number 32 in Sweden at the start of April. The following year, the song made an appearance on the UK Singles Chart, at number 60. It was re-released on 8 April 2005 as a maxi-CD single, and appeared on the band's album of that year, Paper Tigers. The re-release peaked at number eight on the UK Singles Chart, number 70 on the US Billboard Hot 100 and number 19 on the Billboard Dance/Mix Show Airplay chart.

Track listings

2002–2003

Swedish CD single
 "Jerk It Out"
 "Crazy Chick"
 "Can't Feel My Toes"
 "Junebug"

UK 7-inch single
A. "Jerk It Out"
B. "The Cannibals"

UK CD single
 "Jerk It Out"
 "Out of My Hands"
 "She's a Planet"

2005

UK and European CD single
 "Jerk It Out"
 "The Longer We Stay Together"

UK 7-inch single
A. "Jerk It Out" – 3:15
B. "Up All Night" – 3:30

Australian CD single
 "Jerk It Out"
 "Jerk It Out" (New Brauer mix)
 "The Longer We Stay Together"

Charts

Weekly charts

Year-end charts

Certifications

Release history

Use in media
The song's appearance on charts was helped by prolific use in mid-2000s media, including commercials for the iPod Shuffle, Mobiltel, Nivea, Coca-Cola (in South Africa and Indonesia) as well as a 2009 Renault Mégane spot. Furthermore, it was used in the video games Dance Dance Revolution SuperNova (arcade and PlayStation 2 versions), FIFA Football 2004, FIFA 23, Just Dance,  LMA Manager, Rock Band 3 (as downloadable content), Samba de Amigo (downloadable content for the Wii version) and SSX 3'

The song was part of the soundtrack of many films, including The Benchwarmers; Captivity; Deuce Bigalow: European Gigolo; Fun with Dick and Jane; and Yours, Mine and Ours. It featured in trailers for Knight and Day, The Pink Panther and Garfield Gets Real, while the remix of the song was used in the trailer for Clerks II.

The song was used in the car sketch in the Eddsworld short "Random Bits".

The song was included in the TV series Dawson's Creek, the CBS series Cold Case, the NBC series Las Vegas, the HBO series Entourage, NCIS, and the British series Teachers.

In 2017, it was sampled by rapper Tiggs Da Author in his song "Work It Out".

In 2020, the song was used to introduce the character Dani Rojas in episode 6 of the TV series Ted Lasso''.

References

2002 songs
2002 singles
2005 singles
Astralwerks singles
Caesars (band) songs
Virgin Records singles
Songs written by Joakim Åhlund